Kiana Tom (born March 14, 1965) is an American television host, fitness expert, model, author, former actress, and businesswoman.  She is best known as the hostess and creator of Kiana's Flex Appeal on ESPN.

Life and Career
Kiana Tom's name and fit body are internationally recognized as the Star of Kiana's Flex Appeal, the #1 rated fitness show reaching 80 million homes in 100 countries on ESPN for over a decade. Tom was one of the original cast members of the syndicated program BodyShaping, which aired on ESPN from 1990 to 1998.

In 1995, Kiana Tom created, hosted and co-produced her own fitness series, Kiana's Flex Appeal, a lifestyle, health and fitness program on ESPN. Kiana has written & led tens of thousands of televised workout segments that have motivated millions of viewers toward a lifestyle of health & fitness.

Kiana put her Flex Appeal touch on the entire production including location scouting and selecting the most beautiful locations, interviewing and selecting co-production companies, choosing cast and crew, developing and creating show segments such as Home Gym, Pro Gym, Target Training, Aqua Flex, Fact or Fiction, and Did You Know…

Due to the program's initial high ratings, ESPN chose to develop other shows around Tom, including Kiana's Too Fit 2 Quit, Summer Sizzle with Kiana & Hot Summer Nights with Kiana.  Tom has also hosted ABC Super Bowl Nightlife, and has many other television hosting credits.

Tom had a brief stint as an actress, her first role being a cameo appearance in the straight-to-video Cyber Bandits, which was released in 1995. In 1999, she acted in her second movie Universal Soldier: The Return with Jean-Claude Van Damme; she is a part of a research team. It is her only theatrical film appearance. According to the New York Times review of the film, the presence of the fitness guru compounded the physicality of the film. She also appeared in a cameo appearance with Eminem in the music video for "Without Me."

Other work
Tom is a co-author of Kiana's Body Sculpting, a 144-page guide to improving fitness and strength, which was published in 1994. She is a recipient of the prestigious United States Sports Academy award for her contributions to the health and fitness industry. Tom was interviewed on behalf of the President's Council on Physical Fitness and Sports at the inaugural X Games in Newport, Rhode Island in 1995. She was also a cheerleader for the Oakland Raiders for two seasons.

She posed nude for the May 2002 edition of Playboy magazine.  According to one interview, she was such a perfectionist that she had to wait until the right time in her career where she felt her body was in the best shape it had ever been.

Personal life
Tom was married to Dennis Breshears, a Deputy Fire Chief for the Los Angeles County Fire Department, from 2002 to 2022. She has two daughters, Anelalani and Kiana Jr. Her father, Layne Tom Jr., was an actor who played various children (including Charlie Chan Jr.) in a number of Charlie Chan films. He also appeared in films with Shirley Temple, in the movie Hurricane, and was the Asian Boy Ranger in Mr. Smith Goes to Washington. Kiana's mother, Marilynn is a former physical education teacher, as well as a tennis, basketball and volleyball coach.

Kiana is part Hawaiian, Chinese, and Irish. Her name means "Island Princess" in Hawaiian.

Filmography

References

External links

1965 births
American cheerleaders
American exercise instructors
American exercise and fitness writers
Female models from Hawaii
American film actresses
American sports businesspeople
American television hosts
American women in business
American writers of Chinese descent
Businesspeople from Hawaii
Native Hawaiian writers
National Football League cheerleaders
Living people
Oakland Raiders personnel
People from Maui
Writers from Hawaii
Hawaii people of Chinese descent
American women non-fiction writers
American women television presenters
21st-century American women